Southdale is a provincial electoral division in the Canadian province of Manitoba. It was created in the provincial redistribution 1999, mostly out of Niakwa and part of St. Vital.  The riding is located in the southeastern section of the City of Winnipeg.

Southdale is bordered on the east by the rural ridings of La Verendrye and Springfield, to the south by Seine River, to the north by Radisson and St. Boniface, and to the west by Riel and St. Vital.

The riding's population in 1996 was 19,029. Its character is mostly middle class. In 1999, the average family income was $68,944, and the unemployment rate was 5.00%. Twelve per cent of Southdale's residents are francophone. Health and social service work accounts for 14% of Southdale's industry.

From 2003 to 2007, Southdale was the only riding in southeastern Winnipeg to be represented by a Progressive Conservative, following historical breakthroughs by the New Democratic Party of Manitoba (NDP) in surrounding ridings in the 2003 provincial election. The NDP proceeded to oust incumbent MLA Jack Reimer in the 2007 provincial election, completing their sweep of Southeast Winnipeg. The seat remained NDP from 2007 until 2016 when it returned to the PCs.

Members of the Legislative Assembly

Electoral results

Previous boundaries

References

Manitoba provincial electoral districts
Politics of Winnipeg